Natalia Filimonovna Bestemianova or Bestemyanova (born 6 January 1960) is a Soviet and Russian former competitive ice dancer who competed for the Soviet Union. With her partner Andrei Bukin, she is the 1988 Olympic Champion, 1984 Olympic silver medalist, four-time World champion, three-time World silver medalist, and five-time European champion.

Life and career 
Bestemianova was coached by Tatiana Tarasova and competed in ice dance with Andrei Bukin. In 1984, she was named an Honoured Master of Sports of the USSR. Bestemianova and Bukin capped their lengthy career by winning the gold medal at the 1988 Winter Olympics and that year's World Figure Skating Championships. The Besti Squat was Bestemianova's signature move and is unofficially named for her.

In 1983, Bestemianova married Igor Bobrin. After she finished her career she performed in the Ice Miniature Theater, led by her husband. She is the stepmother of Maxim, Igor's son from his previous marriage. Together, they run Moscow Stars on Ice.

In 2006–2008, Bestemianova appeared as a coach and show-host in the Russian version of the British show Dancing on Ice, shown on Russian RTR. In early 2007, she appeared as a member of the ice panel for the British show Dancing on Ice, shown on ITV1. In 2011—2012, Bestemianova was on the panel of judges for the Channel One Russia television show Cup of Professionals.

Competitive highlights

Ice dance with Bukin

Ladies' singles

Programs 
(With Bukin)

See also
 Besti squat

References

External links
 "Bobrin's Moscow Stars on Ice official site"

1960 births
Living people
Soviet female ice dancers
Russian female ice dancers
Olympic figure skaters of the Soviet Union
Figure skaters at the 1980 Winter Olympics
Figure skaters at the 1984 Winter Olympics
Figure skaters at the 1988 Winter Olympics
Olympic gold medalists for the Soviet Union
Olympic silver medalists for the Soviet Union
Honoured Masters of Sport of the USSR
Recipients of the Order of Friendship of Peoples
Recipients of the Order of the Red Banner of Labour
Figure skaters from Moscow
Olympic medalists in figure skating
World Figure Skating Championships medalists
European Figure Skating Championships medalists
Medalists at the 1984 Winter Olympics
Medalists at the 1988 Winter Olympics
Russian State University of Physical Education, Sport, Youth and Tourism alumni